Bodhu Kon Alo Laaglo Chokhe is a Bengali television serial which used to air on GEC Star Jalsha. It was produced by Shree Venkatesh Films and starred Payel Dey and Sourav Chakraborty in the lead roles. After running for successful two and half years, it got replaced by Tumi Asbe Bole.

Plot 
The serial takes its name from a song from the dance drama Chitrangada, by Tagore. This is a story of a beautiful girl name Aalo and the various ups and downs she goes throughout her life. A failed marriage caused Aalo to attempt suicide but the twist of fate brought Sourav to her. Aalo accepts to nurture Sourav's daughter Icche, who suffers from an incurable disease. Though Aalo and Sourav care for each other they never represented themselves as ideal married couple as both of them are traumatized with their past experience of marriage.

Cast 
 Payel De as Aalo Moitra aka Aalo Lahiri aka Aalo Sarkhel
 Sourav Chakraborty as Sourav Moitra
 Chandrayee Ghosh as Debjani Moitra / Debi
 Koushik Roy as Sougata Moitra
 Sagnik Chatterjee as Sourish Moitra
 Sohini Sanyal as Indrani / Indu
 Elfina Mukherjee as Chandrani / Chhutki
 Manoj Ojha as DK
 Ananya Chatterjee as Debi's Mother
 Ashmita Mukherjee as Sharmi
 Tapan Ganguly as Surendranath Moitra
 Sushmita Dey as Malobika Dutta / Mishtu
 Antara as Bonolata aka Lata
 Ratna Ghoshal as Pishima
 Ripom Majumdar as Shobuj / Debarshi
 Saayoni Ghosh as Ujjaini Sen / Rini
 Kaushik Chakraborty as Late Adinath Siddhanth
 Arindam Chatterjee as Angshuman Lahiri
 Arpita Mukherjee as Mallika
 Debdut Ghosh as SK
 Swagata Mukherjee as Surekha
 Rajat Ganguly as Mamadadu
 Bodhisatva Majumdar as Late Samarendranath Lahiri / Shomu
 Shakuntala Barua as Nonibala
 Ratri Ghatak as Angshuman's younger sister in law
 Koushani Roy as Rupa
 Kaushik Bhattacharya as Rupa's Husband
 Saugata Bandyopadhyay as Angshuman's Boss
 Manasi Sinha as Aalo' s Mother
 Debesh Chattopadhyay as Aalo' s Father
 Subhajit Bakshi as Aalo's Brother
 Ekavali Khanna as Rinky
 Joyjit Banerjee as Shambhu
 Animesh Bhaduri as Indu's Husband
 Indrani Basu as Ujjaini's Mother.
 Moumi Bose as Ichche Moitra
 Prity Biswas as Suhaani Sharma
 Basanti Chatterjee as Mishtu's Grandmother

References

External links 
 Official Website
 
Bengali-language television programming in India
Star Jalsha original programming
2012 Indian television series debuts
2014 Indian television series endings